Delhi, originally called Deerfield, is a town in Richland Parish, Louisiana, United States. As of the 2020 census, the town population was 2,622.

History

During the American Civil War, Delhi and Monroe, the seat of Ouachita Parish, were overcrowded with unwelcome refugees from rural areas to the east when the forces of General U.S. Grant moved into northeastern Louisiana.  Grant spent the winter of 1862-1863 at Winter Quarters south of Newellton in Tensas Parish in preparation for the siege of Vicksburg, Mississippi. He did not take the river port city until July 4, 1863. Historian John D. Winters reported "strong Union sympathy" in both Delhi and Monroe.

In the 1940s, Delhi was the center of a large natural gas boom. Numerous workers came to work in the industry. Several functioning gas fields still surround the town.

From 1968-1969, Delhi Fire Department was home to the now defunct Louisiana State Police - Troop O. The site was abandoned in 1969 after thirteen months' operation, with state services reverting to be provided by Troop F in Monroe.

On February 21, 1971, as part of the February 1971 Mississippi Delta tornado outbreak, Louisiana's only recorded F5 tornado struck outside of Delhi. It resulted in forty-seven deaths and was the deadliest F5 tornado to hit the United States since the Jackson, Mississippi, Candlestick Park tornado in 1966. It was the earliest confirmed F5 tornado during a year.

Delhi has a drug store, the E.W. Thomsom Drug Company, which has operated continuously since 1873 in the same downtown location. The company has been owned for four generations by the McEacharn family, who purchased it from the Thomsons in the early 1920s. Pharmacist Wilfred Bruce McEacharn (born 1956) is the current owner. The lunch counter sells hand-crafted milk shakes and old-fashioned fountain Coca-Colas. Popular menu items include cheeseburgers and plates of tuna and chicken salad. Shari McEacharn, his wife, operates a gift shop within the drug store. The Thomson Company remains a mainstay of Delhi for all generations of patrons.

Geography
Delhi is located at  (32.455948, -91.493345). The town lies at the confluence of U.S. Route 80 and Louisiana Highway 17, and near to Interstate 20.

The elevation of  spared Delhi from the brunt of the Great Mississippi Flood of 1927 that destroyed most of the surrounding Mississippi River Delta area.

The Poverty Point Reservoir, which hosts the acclaimed Black Bear Golf Club and the Poverty Point Reservoir State Park, is located just north of Delhi on Louisiana State Highway 17 near Warden. The reservoir project was pushed to fruition by State Senator Francis C. Thompson of Delhi.

Demographics

2020 census

As of the 2020 United States census, there were 2,622 people, 1,082 households, and 641 families residing in the town.

2000 census
As of the census of 2000, there were 3,066 people, 1,129 households, and 788 families residing in the town. The population density was 1,215.2 people per square mile. There were 1,253 housing units at an average density of 496.6 per square mile. The racial makeup of the town was 42.24% White, 56.78% African American, 0.07% Native American, 0.10% Asian, 0.36% from other races, and 0.46% from two or more races. Hispanic or Latino of any race were 0.98% of the population.

There were 1,129 households, out of which 32.4% had children under the age of 18 living with them, 41.5% were married couples living together, 24.5% had a female householder with no husband present, and 30.2% were non-families. 27.3% of all households were made up of individuals, and 15.7% had someone living alone who was 65 years of age or older. The average household size was 2.54 and the average family size was 3.10.

In the town, the population was spread out, with 26.7% under the age of 18, 10.2% from 18 to 24, 25.9% from 25 to 44, 18.4% from 45 to 64, and 18.9% who were 65 years of age or older. The median age was 36 years. For every 100 females, there were 80.8 males. For every 100 females age 18 and over, there were 76.0 males.

The median income for a household in the town was $21,763, and the median income for a family was $25,651. Males had a median income of $25,054 versus $12,837 for females. The per capita income for the town was $11,161. About 26.2% of families and 31.6% of the population were below the poverty line, including 45.7% of those under age 18 and 21.8% of those age 65 or over.

Education
Public schools in Richland Parish are operated by the Richland Parish School Board. Three campuses serve the town of Delhi - Delhi Elementary School (Grades PK-4), Delhi Middle School (Grades 5-8), and Delhi High School (Grades 9-12).

Delhi Charter School (DCS) (K-12) is an area charter school.

Notable people

Earl Holliman, Golden Globe award-winning film and television actor known for movies such as The Sons of Katie Elder, Gunfight at the O.K. Corral and Giant and TV series Police Woman
Arlene Howell, Miss Louisiana USA 1958, Miss USA 1958 and television actress
Bnois King, jazz and blues musician, was born in Delhi
Bob Love, basketball player, went to high school in Delhi
Charles A. Marvin, judge of the Louisiana Court of Appeal for the Second Circuit from 1975 to 1999; worked as news editor at Delhi Dispatch c. 1950 
Tim McGraw, country singer originally from Start
Andrew "Blueblood" McMahon, Chicago blues bass guitarist, singer and songwriter
Pat "Gravy" Patterson, longtime baseball coach at Louisiana Tech University
Steve Pylant, former sheriff of Franklin Parish and Republican departing member of the Louisiana House of Representatives, resides in Franklin Parish near Delhi
Johnny Robinson, 6 Time NFL All Pro, 2020 NFL Hall of Fame Inductee, 1970 Super Bowl Champion with the Kansas City Kansas City Chiefs
Charles and Sam Wyly, businessmen who endowed Wyly Tower of Learning at Louisiana Tech
Billy "Acorn Head" Williams Offshore Operations Supervisor for Chevron Corporation

References

External links
Delhi Progress, Community Progress Site for Delhi, LA

Towns in Richland Parish, Louisiana
Towns in Louisiana